San Telmo ("Saint Peter González" or "Saint Erasmus of Formia") was a Spanish 74-gun ship of the line, launched in 1788. It sank while bringing reinforcements to Peru during the war of independence, and some of its crew or passengers may have discovered and landed on Antarctica.

History 

In 1819, the San Telmo, commanded by Captain Joaquín de Toledo y Parra, was the flagship of a Spanish naval squadron under Brigadier Rosendo Porlier y Asteguieta bound for Callao, Peru, to reinforce colonial forces there fighting the independence movements in Spanish America. It was damaged by severe weather in the Drake Passage, south of Cape Horn on 2 September 1819.

Legacy 

A portion of the 644 officers, soldiers and seamen of the San Telmo may have been the first people to land on Antarctica. Some remnants and signs of the wreckage were later found by William Smith on Livingston Island in the South Shetland Islands. If any crew members survived the initial sinking and managed to land there, they would have been the first humans in history to reach the continent.

San Telmo Island, off the north coast of Livingston Island, is named after the ship.

Moments prior to the battle that led to the capture of Valdivia in February 1820 the patriot force told the Spanish garrison of the Valdivian Fort System they were part of the convoy of San Telmo. Using this tactic they were able to approach the beach at Aguada del Inglés largely undisturbed before their amphibious assault begun.

See also 

List of ships of the line of Spain
List of disasters in Antarctica by death toll

References

External links 

 El San Telmo. Una historia sin final. 

History of Antarctica
Ships of the Spanish Navy
Colonial Peru
Maritime incidents in 1819
Livingston Island
Shipwrecks in the Southern Ocean
1819 in Antarctica
1788 ships
Spain and the Antarctic
1819 in the Spanish Empire